Chan Chin-wei and Xu Yifan were the defending champions but Xu chose to participate at Guangzhou instead. Chan partnered Hsu Chieh-yu, but lost in the semifinals to Mona Barthel and Mandy Minella. 

Lara Arruabarrena and Irina-Camelia Begu are the new champions, defeating in the final Mona Barthel and Mandy Minella with the score 6–3, 6–3.

Seeds

Draw

Draw

References
 Main Draw

2014 WTA Tour
2014 Doubles
2014 in South Korean tennis